The Legislative Assembly of Paraíba is the unicameral legislature of Paraíba state in Brazil. It has 36 state deputies elected by proportional representation.

The Proncincial Assembly was founded on April 7, 1835 and during the Imperial Period featured 27 legislatures lasting two years, after the Proclamation of the Republic the Assembly became bicameral in 1892, the Assembly was closed between 1930 and 1934 returning after the Estado Novo became unicameral.

References

External links
Official website

 
Politics of Paraíba
Paraiba